Mark John Reckless (born 6 December 1970) is a British politician who served as a Member of the Senedd (MS) for South Wales East from 2016 until 2021, having previously served as Member of Parliament (MP) for Rochester and Strood from 2010 to 2015. Initially a member of the Conservative Party, he crossed the floor to join the UK Independence Party (UKIP) in September 2014. He has since changed parties a further three times.

While a member of the House of Commons, Reckless was noted for his rebelliousness; he cast 56 votes against the whip between 2010 and 2014, making him the 13th most rebellious Conservative Party MP in the period. He led a rebellion of 53 Conservative MPs on the EU budget, which inflicted the first House of Commons defeat on the coalition government. From November 2010, he served as a member of the Home Affairs Select Committee. After crossing the floor, he won re-election as a UKIP MP in a by-election held in November 2014 but lost his seat to the Conservatives at the 2015 general election.

A Eurosceptic, Reckless was elected to the National Assembly for Wales, later known as the Senedd, in 2016. He campaigned to leave the European Union in the 2016 EU membership referendum. He subsequently left UKIP to join the Conservative Group in the National Assembly before joining the Brexit Party in 2019 when he was appointed its leader in the National Assembly by Nigel Farage. On 19 October 2020, he joined the Abolish the Welsh Assembly Party; the party lost both of its seats in the 2021 Senedd Election.

Early life and career
Born in London, Reckless was educated at Marlborough College before attending Christ Church, Oxford, where he read philosophy, politics and economics. He then pursued postgraduate studies at Columbia Business School in the United States, receiving an MBA. At Columbia he studied alongside writer Jacob Appel, and is the subject of several thinly-veiled anecdotes in Appel's satire The Man Who Wouldn't Stand Up. After university, he trained as a barrister at the College of Law, gaining an LLB, and was called to the Bar in 2007.

In the mid-1990s, Reckless worked for UBS Warburg. In the late 1990s, he worked as a strategy consultant and associate in Financial Services Group at Booz, Allen & Hamilton. Until his election in May 2010, Reckless had been a solicitor at Herbert Smith and had worked on legal matters that had had dealings with private investigators. He was a member of the Kent Police Authority from 2007 to 2011.

Member of Parliament
Between 2002 and 2004, Reckless was a member of the policy unit at Conservative Central Office where he wrote a book on deregulation policy as well as overseeing the development of the policy on directly elected police commissioners. The first police and crime commissioner elections took place on 15 November 2012.

Reckless was elected as Member of Parliament for Rochester and Strood at the 2010 general election. He had a majority of 9,953, having previously contested the Medway constituency in 2001 and 2005, reducing the majority of the incumbent Labour MP to 3,780 in 2001 and 213 in 2005. He had served as a Medway councillor between 2007 and 2011. The UK Independence Party did not run a candidate of their own in Rochester and Strood in 2010, instead endorsing Reckless.

Reckless was elected to the Home Affairs Select Committee in 2010 often appearing on Newsnight and other political programmes, arguing for the deportation of clerics Abu Hamza and Abu Qatada. He was one of parliament's most rebellious MPs and was the 13th most rebellious Conservative MP between 2010 and 2014, casting 56 votes against the whip. He was one of only six Conservative MPs to vote against increase of university tuition fees, and was a critic of the government's energy policy, arguing that the government's Energy Bill introduced in December 2012 was "a sad retreat for Conservatives".

In July 2010, Reckless apologised for missing a vote on the budget because he was drunk. He said that he "did not feel it was appropriate to take part in the vote because of the amount he had drunk".

In 2011, he abstained on the military intervention in Libya.

A Eurosceptic, Reckless is also a critic of the European Court of Human Rights, saying it erodes "British freedom and democracy".

He was chair of the all-party parliamentary group on Georgia. The group's aims are "to facilitate greater parliamentary awareness of developments in Georgia".

On 30 September 2014, Reckless applied for the Stewardship of the Chiltern Hundreds and therefore ceased to be an MP. A by-election was called on 20 November, at which Reckless was nominated to stand as the UKIP candidate. He was returned as a member of parliament for UKIP, becoming the party's second elected MP.

European Union budget rebellion
On 31 October 2012, Reckless led a rebellion of 53 Conservative MPs which inflicted the first House of Commons defeat (307 votes to 294) on the coalition government. The Tory rebels voted with Labour MPs to pass an amendment calling for a real-terms cut in the 2014–2020 EU budget multi-annual financial framework. The coalition government supported only a real-terms freeze in the EU budget as a minimum. The amendment was not binding on the government, but damaged prime minister David Cameron's authority on Europe before key EU budget negotiations in November 2012. As a result of leading the successful rebellion, Reckless was voted 'Backbencher of the Year' by the Conservatives and finished third in a ConservativeHome poll of 'Backbencher of the Year', although the site's editor Tim Montgomerie announced that 'if UKIP readers had been included in the poll Mark Reckless would have topped the vote.'

Defection to UKIP
On 27 September 2014, Reckless defected to the UK Independence Party at its party conference in Doncaster, and announced his resignation in order to seek re-election at a by-election. He became the second Conservative MP in the space of a month to defect to UKIP, the first being his close friend Douglas Carswell. In a speech delivered to the conference, Reckless claimed that the Conservative leadership was 'not serious about real change on Europe', and that 'Britain could be better'.

Although he won the by-election on 20 November 2014 as a UKIP candidate, in the 2015 general election Reckless lost his seat to the Conservative candidate, Kelly Tolhurst.

In June 2015, Reckless was made Director of Policy Development by UKIP.

Member of the Senedd

In March 2016, Reckless was announced as UKIP's lead candidate for the regional seat of South Wales East despite having no previous links to Wales. He was elected on 5 May 2016.

On 6 April 2017, Reckless left UKIP to join the Conservative Group; however, he did not rejoin the Conservative Party. This move made the Conservative group the second-largest in the Welsh Assembly. Upon leaving, he said, "I leave UKIP positively, having achieved our joint aim, a successful referendum to leave the EU".

On 14 April 2019, Reckless left the Conservative Party Group over the party's failure to deliver Brexit. He then sat as an independent member before joining the Brexit Party the following month.

On 15 May 2019, Reckless stated his intention to form a new Brexit Party political group in the Senedd, along with Caroline Jones, Mandy Jones, and David Rowlands, with himself as the leader of the group. In July 2020, he attracted criticism from pro-devolution Brexit Party volunteers when he stated that he would support the campaign to abolish the Senedd. He then left the party and joined the Abolish the Welsh Assembly Party. He said, since Brexit had been effectively achieved, the work of the Brexit Party was complete. Two weeks later, the Brexit Party was rebranded as Reform UK.

Reckless stood for  the Abolish the Welsh Assembly Party in the 2021 Senedd election, contesting the constituency seat of Monmouth and again stood as a regional candidate for South Wales East; he was unsuccessful in getting re-elected to the Senedd.

Electoral history
 2016 Welsh Assembly Election, South Wales East

Rochester and Strood, 2015

Rochester and Strood 2014
See 2014 Rochester and Strood by-election

Rochester and Strood 2010
The Rochester and Strood seat was fought for the first time at the 2010 general election.
Following its boundary review of parliamentary representation in Kent, the Boundary Commission for England renamed the Medway (UK Parliament constituency) seat to Rochester and Strood. This is because the commission agreed that the term Medway is now primarily used for the larger unitary authority.

Medway 2005

Medway 2001

Personal life
Reckless is a grandson of Henry McDevitt, who served as a Fianna Fáil TD for Donegal East in Dáil Éireann, the Irish parliament, from 1938 until 1943. His mother emigrated to the UK when she was 17 to train as a nurse; however, Reckless has said that he does not see his mother as an "immigrant" and stated "I don't consider myself to have an immigrant background".

He married Catriona Brown at Westminster Cathedral on 1 October 2011; the reception was held in the Palace of Westminster. His best man was Daniel Hannan MEP. Reckless had been the best man at Hannan's wedding.

See also
 List of elected British politicians who have changed party affiliation

References

External links

 Mark Reckless MP Conservative Party official biog
 TheyWorkForYou Voting Record
 Public Whip Voting Record
 BBC Democracy Live  MP Profile
  MP Website (old)
Appearances on C-SPAN

1970 births
Alumni of Christ Church, Oxford
Alumni of The University of Law
Booz Allen Hamilton people
Columbia Business School alumni
Conservative Party (UK) MPs for English constituencies
English people of Irish descent
English Roman Catholics
Living people
People educated at Marlborough College
People from Kent
UBS people
UK Independence Party members of the Senedd
Reform UK members of the Senedd
UK Independence Party MPs
UK MPs 2010–2015
Wales MSs 2016–2021
British Eurosceptics